Simon Francis Mann (born 26 June 1952) is a British mercenary and former officer in the SAS. He trained to be an officer at Sandhurst and was commissioned into the Scots Guards. He later became a member of the SAS. On leaving the military, he co-founded Sandline International with fellow ex-Scots Guards Colonel Tim Spicer in 1996. Sandline operated mostly in Angola and Sierra Leone, but a contract with the government of Papua New Guinea attracted a significant amount of negative publicity in what became known as the Sandline affair.

On 7 March 2004, Mann is alleged to have led the 2004 Equatorial Guinea coup d'état attempt. He was arrested by Zimbabwean police in Harare airport along with 64 other mercenaries. He eventually served three years of a four-year prison sentence in Zimbabwe, and less than two years of a 34 years and four months sentence in Equatorial Guinea.

Early life
Simon Mann's father, George, captained the England cricket team in the late 1940s and was an heir to a stake in the Watney Mann brewing empire that closed in 1979, having been acquired by Grand Metropolitan (which, in 1997, became Diageo plc on its merger with Guinness). His mother is South African.

Military career
After leaving Eton College, Mann trained to be an officer at Sandhurst and was commissioned into the Scots Guards on 16 December 1972. By 1976, he held the rank of Lieutenant. He later became a member of the SAS and served in Cyprus, Germany, Norway and Northern Ireland before leaving the forces in 1985. He volunteered as a reservist for the Gulf War.

Post-military career

Executive Outcomes
Mann then entered the field of computer security; however, his interest in this industry lapsed when he returned from his service in the Gulf and he entered the oil industry to work with Tony Buckingham. Buckingham also had a military background and had been a diver in the North Sea oil industry before joining a Canadian oil firm. In 1993, UNITA rebels in Angola seized the port of Soyo, and closed its oil installations. The Angolan government under José Eduardo dos Santos sought mercenaries to seize back the port and asked for assistance from Buckingham who had by now formed his own company.

Sandline International

Mann went on to establish Sandline International with fellow ex-Scots Guards Colonel Tim Spicer in 1996. The company operated mostly in Angola and Sierra Leone, but in 1997 Sandline received a commission from the government of Papua New Guinea to suppress a rebellion on the island of Bougainville and the company came to international prominence, but received much negative publicity following the Sandline affair. Sandline International announced the closure of the company's operations on 16 April 2004. In an interview on the Today Programme, Mann indicated that the operations in Angola had netted more than £10,000,000.

Equatorial Guinea coup attempt

On 7 March 2004, Mann and 69 others were arrested in Zimbabwe when their Boeing 727 was seized by security forces during a stop-off at Harare's airport to be loaded with £100,000 worth of weapons and equipment. The men were charged with violating the country's immigration, firearms and security laws and later accused of engaging in an attempt to stage a coup d'état in Equatorial Guinea. Meanwhile, eight suspected mercenaries, one of whom later died in prison, were detained in Equatorial Guinea in connection with the alleged plot. Mann and the others claimed that they were not on their way to Equatorial Guinea but were in fact flying to the Democratic Republic of Congo to provide security for diamond mines. Mann and his colleagues were put on trial in Zimbabwe, and, on 27 August, Mann was found guilty of attempting to buy arms for an alleged coup plot and sentenced to 7 years imprisonment. 66 of the others were acquitted.

On 25 August 2004, Sir Mark Thatcher, son of former British Prime Minister Margaret Thatcher, was arrested at his home in Cape Town, South Africa. He eventually pleaded guilty (under a plea bargain) to negligently supplying financial assistance for the plot. The 14 men in the mercenary advance guard that were caught in Equatorial Guinea were sentenced to jail for 34 years.

Among the advance guard was Nick du Toit who claimed that he had been introduced to Thatcher by Mann. Investigations later revealed in Mann's holdings' financial records that large transfers of money were made to du Toit, as well as approximately US$2 million coming in from an unknown and untraceable source. On 10 September Mann was sentenced to seven years in jail. His compatriots received one-year sentences for violating immigration laws and their two pilots got 16 months. The group's Boeing 727 was seized, as well as the US$180,000 that was found on board the plane.

Exposure
A friend of Mann's, Nigel Morgan, known for his personal ties to the South African Secret Service, was alleged to have betrayed knowledge of the plot to the South African authorities. The journalist Adam Roberts has argued that Morgan was in the unusual situation of being both a supporter of the coup and also an agent for the government, and that Mann knew Morgan was acting as an informant – but as a way of sounding out whether or not the South African government would care. Mann may then have given the go-ahead under the false belief that South Africa tacitly approved.

Academic R.W. Johnson, on the other hand, argued that only the 'shambolic state of the South African intelligence services' explains why an aborted 19 February attempt by Mann – which fell apart when a plane set to meet them in Zambia suffered a bird strike – was allowed to get off the ground in Polokwane Airport. He emphasises that Morgan had personal and professional ties to Johann Smith, a South African Special Forces veteran and security adviser to President Teodoro Obiang Nguema, and most likely alerted President Thabo Mbeki after the failed first attempt, who in turn tipped off the government of Robert Mugabe.

Peter Fabricius, writing in the South African Journal of International Affairs, suggested President Mbeki, once informed of Mann's plan, allowed the plotters to take off and then be caught on the tarmac in Zimbabwe, in order to make a public example of the Wonga coup and deter further mercenary activity.

Charges dropped and extradition
On 23 February 2007, charges were dropped against Mann and the other alleged conspirators in South Africa. Mann remained in Zimbabwe, where he was convicted of charges from the same incident. On 2 May 2007, a Zimbabwe court ruled that Mann should be extradited to Equatorial Guinea to face charges, although the Zimbabweans promised that he would not face the death penalty. His extradition was described as the "oil for Mann" deal, in reference to the large amounts of oil that Mugabe has managed to secure from Equatorial Guinea. Mann lost his last appeal against the decision to extradite him. In a last-ditch effort on 30 January 2008, Mann tried to appeal the judgment to the Zimbabwean Supreme Court. The following day, Mann was deported to Equatorial Guinea in secret, leading to claims by his lawyers that the extradition was hastened to defeat the possibility of appeal to the Supreme Court. In Equatorial Guinea Mann was incarcerated in Black Beach Prison, Africa's most notorious prison which is synonymous with brutality.

Response by UK Parliamentarians
Concern for Mann's plight was raised in the UK Parliament in the year of his arrest in Zimbabwe by three Conservative Members of Parliament. During the two years after the government of Equatorial Guinea applied for his extradition, three further Conservative Party MPs submitted written questions.

The sudden extradition drew the greatest response. Julian Lewis said in Parliament: 
That position was supported by three other Conservative MPs during the debate. Written questions were submitted by a fourth.

There was a request that the United States administration, which had access to Simon Mann in Black Beach Prison on 6 February 2008, exert its influence "to secure [his] safe return". UK officials were granted access to him on 12 February 2008. Labour and other parties expressed little concern about Mann or the others. The only non-Conservative Party MP to submit a question in Parliament about him was Vince Cable, although an Early Day Motion about his treatment in prison received some cross-party support.

On 8 March 2008, Channel 4 in the UK won a legal battle to broadcast an interview with Mann in which he named British political figures, including Ministers, alleged to have given tacit approval to the coup plot. In testimony, he spoke frankly about the events leading to the botched attempt to topple Equatorial Guinea's president.

Despite their charges being unrelated, Mann was tried alongside six Progress Party of Equatorial Guinea activists being held on weapons charges, including opposition leader Severo Moto's former secretary Gerardo Angüe Mangue. On 7 July 2008, Mann was sentenced by an Equatoguinean court to more than 34 years in prison.

Release
On 2 November 2009, he was given "a complete pardon on humanitarian grounds" by President Obiang. He lives in the New Forest.

In popular media
 In 2002, Mann played Lieutenant-Colonel Derek Wilford of the Parachute Regiment for Granada Television's Bloody Sunday, a dramatisation by Paul Greengrass of the events of Bloody Sunday.
 The alleged coup planned for Equatorial Guinea is the subject of the film Coup!, written by John Fortune. Mann is played by Jared Harris, with Robert Bathurst as Mark Thatcher. It was broadcast on BBC Two on 30 June 2006 and on ABC in Australia on 21 January 2008.
 Mann was interviewed from prison in the documentary Once Upon A Coup, which aired on PBS's Wide Angle in August 2009.

Memoirs
Mann's memoir, Cry Havoc, was published in 2011, to mixed reviews.

See also
Executive Outcomes
Mark Thatcher
Sandline International

References

Further reading
  – covers the birth and rise of Executive Outcomes and Sandline, as well as the events in Sierra Leone and Bougainville
 
 
  – Documents Pelton's time with Nick Du Toit, the planning behind the coup, his efforts to free Nick by meeting with President Obiang and Mann's arrival from Zimbabwe

Further viewing
Once Upon a Coup, PBS Documentary, August 2009, Once Upon a Coup ~ Full Episode | Wide Angle | PBS

External links

 Simon Mann at Kruger Cowne
 Profile: Simon Mann, BBC News, 10 September 2004
 Simon Mann Dossier, by Journalismus Nachrichten von Heute
 Q&A: Equatorial Guinea coup plot, BBC World News
 "A Coup for a Mountain of Wonga"
 "British Mercenary Simon Mann's last Journey?"
 "The trial of Simon Mann"
 

1952 births
Living people
Military personnel from Aldershot
Scots Guards officers
Special Air Service officers
Graduates of the Royal Military Academy Sandhurst
People educated at Eton College
Prisoners and detainees of Zimbabwe
English people imprisoned abroad
Prisoners and detainees of Equatorial Guinea
Recipients of Equatoguinean presidential pardons
English mercenaries
People extradited from Zimbabwe
People extradited to Equatorial Guinea
English memoirists
People from New Forest District
Businesspeople from Aldershot